Sergio Pellicer García (born 9 September 1973) is a Spanish retired footballer who played as a right back, and is the current manager of Málaga CF.

Playing career
Born in Nules, Province of Castellón, most of Pellicer's playing career was spent in Segunda División B, where he made 353 appearances across 16 seasons. His sole professional output was five Segunda División games on loan at Hércules CF in 1995, in his native Valencian Community.

Coaching career
Pellicer worked as a youth or assistant coach at several teams upon retiring. On 29 December 2016 he was appointed as assistant to Marcelo Romero at La Liga club Málaga CF, where he had previously played.

On 23 October 2018, Pellicer was confirmed as manager of Deportivo Fabril, the reserve team of Deportivo de La Coruña who were second from bottom in their third-tier group. He left the following 4 February, with them now dead last and 13 points from safety.

Pellicer returned to Málaga on 1 July 2019, taking over their second team in the Tercera División. Six months later, he was thrust into the first team following the ousting of Víctor Sánchez. On his professional managerial debut on 14 January, his team won 1–0 at home to SD Ponferradina with a second-minute goal by Antoñín.

On 18 May 2021, Pellicer announced his departure from Málaga at the end of the campaign, after keeping the club two consecutive seasons in the second level despite their economic problems. On 15 December, he replaced sacked José Luis Oltra at the helm of fellow second tier side CF Fuenlabrada, but was himself dismissed on 6 March 2022.

After ten months without a club, Pellicer returned to Málaga on 25 January 2023, signing a contract until 2024; he replaced the sacked Pepe Mel.

Managerial statistics

References

External links

CiberChe biography and stats 
Stats and bio at Cadistas1910 

1973 births
Living people
People from Plana Baixa
Sportspeople from the Province of Castellón
Spanish footballers
Footballers from the Valencian Community
Association football defenders
Segunda División players
Segunda División B players
Tercera División players
Valencia CF Mestalla footballers
Hércules CF players
Málaga CF players
Cádiz CF players
Real Jaén footballers
UDA Gramenet footballers
RSD Alcalá players
CD Eldense footballers
Spain youth international footballers
Spanish football managers
Segunda División managers
Tercera División managers
Málaga CF managers
CF Fuenlabrada managers